Ray Fränkel (born 15 September 1982 in Paramaribo) is a Dutch Surinamese footballer who is currently playing for S.V. Transvaal.

Career
Fränkel started his playing career at the local S.V. Transvaal, before being snapped by the Dutch giants Feyenoord Rotterdam. After failing to break into the Feyenoord's first team, Fränkel moved to the Estonian Meistriliiga side Flora Tallinn. He made a total of 14 appearances for Flora, before returning to the Netherlands for the 2003–2004 season, when he signed with FC Groningen.

After failing to make any real impact and finding his first-team opportunities limited at the Eredivisie club, Fränkel moved again. This time to the Eerste Divisie side Fortuna Sittard, but after one season and not much first-team action at the new club, Ray moved to Fortuna's Eerste Divisie rivals HFC Haarlem. In 2007 Fränkel signed with the Belgian club Antwerp FC. After three years was in summer 2010 released by Antwerp and signed on 4 September 2010 with Topklasse club FC Lisse.  After half year resigned his contract with Lisse and joined to Qatar. On July 1, 2013 he signed with one of Suriname's greatest clubs S.V. Transvaal.

Personal life
Ray is the Son of Iwan Fränkel, and the cousin of Purrel Fränkel.

References

Surinamese footballers
Surinamese expatriate footballers
Suriname international footballers
Eredivisie players
Eerste Divisie players
SVB Eerste Divisie players
FC Groningen players
Fortuna Sittard players
FC Flora players
1982 births
Living people
Surinamese expatriate sportspeople in the Netherlands
Expatriate footballers in the Netherlands
Surinamese expatriate sportspeople in Estonia
Expatriate footballers in Estonia
Royal Antwerp F.C. players
Sportspeople from Paramaribo
Expatriate footballers in Belgium
Surinamese expatriate sportspeople in Belgium
S.V. Transvaal players
FC Lisse players
Surinamese expatriate sportspeople in Qatar
Expatriate footballers in Qatar
Al-Shahania SC players
Qatari Second Division players
Association football defenders
Meistriliiga players